Mahant Lachhman Dass Sen. Sec. School  is a public high school in Talwaldi Kalan, Ludhiana, Punjab, India. MLD High School provides education from nursery to secondary.

Founding
MLD High school was founded in 1993 by Mahant Lachhman Dass Educational Society. MLD Educational Society seeks to provide education to students in a rural atmosphere.

Attending the School
MLD students must wear uniforms to school. Fees are due monthly. A bus route is provided for students, and students at V standard and above can rent bicycles for five Rupees per month.

Schedule
MLD High School is on a trimester schedule. Examinations are sat during September, December, and March. Progress reports are sent home every three months.

School Pledge
India is my country, all Indians are my brothers and sisters. I love my country and I am proud of its rich and varied heritage. I shall always strive to be worthy of it. I shall give respect to my parents, teachers and all elders and treat everyone with courtesy. To my country and my people I pledge my devotion. In their well being and prosperity alone, lies my happiness.

School sports and games
Nursery-aged children play:
Dancing
Singing
Simple Exercises

Primary children play:
Folk Dancing
Singing
Music
Ball Throwing
Simple Exercises

Middle students and higher play:
Kabbadi
Kho kho
Volleyball
Field Hockey
Basketball
Cricket

Notes

Educational institutions established in 1993
Ludhiana district
High schools and secondary schools in Punjab, India
1993 establishments in Punjab, India

from Balu